Yashamaru may refer to:
 Yashamaru (Naruto), a fictional character from the anime and manga series Naruto.
 Yashamaru, a fictional character from the novel The Kouga Ninja Scrolls
 Yashamaru (Basilisk), a fictional character in the manga series Basilisk, based on The Kouga Ninja Scrolls character.
 Yashamaru, a childhood name of Katō Kiyomasa.